Buckland is a village and civil parish in the Mole Valley district of Surrey, England, between Dorking and Reigate, its nearest towns. The civil parish is bordered by the North Downs escarpment in the north. The area contains a number of sand pits.

History

Buckland appears in Domesday Book of 1086, as Bochelant.  It was owned by John of Tonbridge.  Buckland had a church, watermill and thirty-five heads of household. Of these, seventeen farmed the land owned by the feudal lord, and ten were serfs.

The village church of St Mary the Virgin was built in 1380. It is a Grade II listed building. The church was rebuilt in 1850 and some of the timbers may have been reused in the construction of Buckland Windmill, also Grade II listed, and now a tourist focal point.

Local legend
Buckland is also the location of the source of the Shag Brook, a tributary of the River Mole. Local legend says the brook was the home of a monstrous horse (in some versions a gorilla), called the Buckland Shag. This beast would drag travellers from the nearby coaching road and devour them on the Shag Stone, a large boulder in the brook with a blood red vein of iron ore running through it. The local parson, Willoughby Bertie, had the Shag Stone removed from the brook in 1757 and thrown from a cliff in Devon. The Buckland Shag then disappeared from local folklore. The legend of the Buckland Shag has recently been revived by a local morris side, The Buckland Shag Morris Men.

Amenities
Buckland has a village store and a pub, The Pheasant, on the Reigate Road.

Transport
The A25 runs east–west through the parish.

Governance
Surrey County Council, elected every four years, has one representative from Buckland for Dorking Rural. Two councillors sit on the Mole Valley borough council.

Demography and housing

The average level of accommodation in the region composed of detached houses was 28%, the average that was apartments was 22.6%.

The proportion of households in the civil parish who owned their home outright compares to the regional average of 35.1%.  The proportion who owned their home with a loan compares to the regional average of 32.5%.  The remaining % is made up of rented dwellings (plus a negligible % of households living rent-free).

References

External links

 Buckland Shag Morris Men
 Buckland war memorial

Villages in Surrey
Mole Valley
Civil parishes in Surrey
Surrey folklore